Ivyann Schwan (born November 14, 1983) is an American actress and singer. She has starred in the movies Parenthood and Problem Child 2. She has appeared in various TV shows such as Bill Nye the Science Guy and The Jenny Jones Show. Schwan has been on stage in such productions as Miracle on 34th street and The Sound of Music. She currently models for ads such as J.C. Penney and Kellogg's Rice Krispies. She also performs with the Olympic World Champion figure skaters in Sun Valley, Georgia. She co-narrated a two-hour charity ice special and emceed a concert for New Kids on the Block. She works with Fred Frank at his Roadshow Music Corporation, a company with a gold and platinum track record, several times a year. A highlight in her singing career was when she was invited to sing the National Anthem at a Seattle SuperSonics home game. Ivyann released her first album, Daisies, in 2000.

Personal life
Schwan's mother, Donna, served as her manager during her child acting career and was also deeply religious, so much so that she turned down an audition for her daughter for the role of Claudia in the film Interview with the Vampire (which eventually went to Kirsten Dunst).

In a 2012 interview, Schwan revealed that she had become a mother.

Filmography
Parenthood – Patty (1989)
Problem Child 2 – Trixie Young (1991)

Television

Stage performance
 The Sound of Music

Albums
 Daisies (2000)

References

External links

1982 births
Living people
American child actresses
21st-century American women